The Nokia E70 is a candybar/fold keyboard-type smartphone from the Eseries range, announced in October 2005 and released in May 2006. There are two models of this phone, the E70-1 for the world market with tri-band (900, 1800, 1900 MHz) GSM and UMTS, and the E70-2 for the Americas with tri-band (850, 1800, 1900 MHz) GSM and EDGE packet data capability. Both models use the S60 platform 3rd Edition on top of Symbian OS version 9.1.

The E70 is the business version/successor to the Nokia 6800 series (6800, 6810, 6820 and 6822).

Key features 
 Screen resolution: 352 × 416
 Processor speed: 220 MHz
 45 MB RAM, about 22 MB available
 Multimedia Messaging v1.2
 Push to talk
 Java MIDP 2.0
 Web Browser for S60
 POP3, IMAP4, SMTP E-mail
 SIP client for VoIP calls
 WiFi (802.11b/g) with WEP/WPA
 Bluetooth with up to six concurrent connections (though only one can be a headset).

 Speaker-independent voice calls and commands
 Speech synthesis mode for visually impaired
 Mini QWERTY fold-out keyboard
 Polyphonic tones and MP3 playback
 35×42 mm display
 Vibrating alert
 HF speakerphone
 Offline mode
 117 × 53 × 22 mm (4.61 × 2.09 × 0.87 in)
 1.01 W/kg (type RM-10), 0.90 W/kg (type RM-24) SAR-Rating

The Nokia E70 is aimed at the high-end professional market. The 16 million color screen has a 352 × 416 pixel (totalling 146,432 pixels) resolution, and the E70 is capable of GSM, WiFi and Bluetooth connectivity. The SIP VoIP functionality will currently not work through a firewall or most router configurations. Nokia has made a statement that they are working on implementing STUN (originally planned for 2006 but only available for E70-1 as of April 2012), TURN and ICE (also planned for 2007 but not available as of June 2008).

As well, the advanced Bluetooth capabilities of the phone, capable of connecting to up to six devices simultaneously, lacks A2DP support.

See also 
 Nokia Eseries
 Symbian
 Nokia Series 60
 List of Nokia products

References

External links 

 Nokia E70-1 Phone Features at Nokia Europe
 Nokia E70 Key Features at Nokia For Business
 Nokia E70 Device Details at Nokia Forum
 Nokia E70-2 Product Page at Nokia USA

Reviews, photos and videos  
 Mobile-Review
 All About Symbian, Video 
 GSM Arena
 Josh Rubin at Cool Hunting: E70 review
 The Register
 Mobile Burn
* Maddox's satirical review

Mobile phones with an integrated hardware keyboard
Mobile phones introduced in 2006
Nokia ESeries
Mobile phones with infrared transmitter